Events from the year 1676 in art.

Events
December 10 - Giuseppe Ghezzi exhibits a number of privately owned works by Venetian masters, borrowed from their owners, in the cloisters of San Salvatore in Rome.
 The portraitist Godfrey Kneller, together with his brother Johann Zacharias, moves from Germany to London, where he settles.

Works

 Claude Lorrain - Aeneas taking leave of Dido in Carthage
 Grinling Gibbons - Statue of King Charles II in Roman costume (gilded bronze)
 Simon Ushakov - Theodore Stratelates

Births
February 2 - Francesco Maria Raineri, Italian sculptor of battle scenes, landscapes, and veduta with historical or mythologic figures (died 1758)
April 24 - Johann Georg Beck, German engraver (died 1722)
June 5 - Marco Ricci, Italian veduta painter (died 1729)
date unknown
Pierre-Jacques Cazes, French historical painter (died 1754)
Sarah Hoadly, English portrait painter (died 1743)
Théobald Michau (or Micho), Flemish painter (died 1765)
Jeong Seon, Korean landscape painter (died 1759)

Deaths
February 14 - Abraham Bosse, French artist, printmaker in etching, and watercolour (born 1602-1604)
May 20? - Jacques Courtois, French painter (born 1621)
August 5 - Pierre Patel ("le bon Patel"), French Baroque era painter (born 1605)
September - Pieter de Keyser, Dutch Golden Age sculptor and architect (born 1595)
October 13 - Juan de Arellano, Spanish painter (born 1614)
 date unknown
Salvatore Castiglione, Italian painter of landscapes and pastoral subjects (born 1620)
Giovan Battista Langetti, Italian painter (born 1625)
Pierre Prieur, French enamel painter (born 1626)
Santo Rinaldi, Italian painter of battle scenes, landscapes, and vedute (born 1620)
Antoinette Bouzonnet-Stella, French engraver (born c.1641)
Domenicus van Tol, Dutch Golden Age painter (born 1635)
probable
Bartolommeo Coriolano, Italian engraver (born 1599)
Abel Schrøder, Danish woodcarver (born 1602)

 
Years of the 17th century in art
1670s in art